Greeley is the home rule municipality city that is the county seat and the most populous municipality of Weld County, Colorado, United States. The city population was 108,795 at the 2020 United States Census, an increase of 17.12% since the 2010 United States Census. Greeley is the tenth most populous city in Colorado. Greeley is the principal city of the Greeley, CO Metropolitan Statistical Area and is a major city of the Front Range Urban Corridor.

History

Union Colony

Greeley began as the Union Colony of Colorado, which was founded in 1869 by Nathan C. Meeker, an agricultural reporter for the New York Tribune as an experimental utopian farming community "based on temperance, religion, agriculture, education and family values," with the backing of the Tribunes editor Horace Greeley, who popularized the phrase "Go West, young man".  A committee which included Meeker and former Civil War general Robert Alexander Cameron traveled to Colorado to find a suitable site, and purchased 12,000 acres at the confluence of the Cache la Poudre and South Platte Rivers.  The site, formerly known as the "Island Grove Ranch", included the area of Latham, an Overland Trail station, and was halfway between Cheyenne, Wyoming and Denver, Colorado along the tracks of the Denver Pacific Railroad.

By May, 500 people had arrived to take up residence in the new colony. The name Union Colony was later changed to Greeley in honor of Horace Greeley, who had come to Colorado in the 1859 Pike's Peak Gold Rush.

Latham
Greeley is located just west of the area previously occupied by the Overland Trail station of Latham, originally called the Cherokee City Station. The Latham station, which was also known as Fort Latham, was built in 1862 and named in honor of Milton S. Latham, one of California's early senators. The stagecoach station was at the confluence of the South Platte River and the Cache la Poudre River. It is believed that the birth of the first white child born in Colorado, a girl, occurred there. Fort Latham was the headquarters of the government troops during the Indian conflicts of 1860–1864 and the county seat; the post office was called Latham.

Early history
Greeley was incorporated as a city on April 6, 1886.

Greeley was built on farming and agriculture, but kept up with most modern technologies as they grew. Telephones were in town by 1883 with electric lights downtown by 1886. Automobiles were on the roads alongside horse drawn buggies by 1910. A Women's Citizens League was established there to support female suffrage.

In 1922 KFKA became one of the first radio stations to broadcast in the US and the Greeley Municipal Airport was built in 1928.

Greeley housed two POW camps in 1943, during World War II. One was for German POWs and the other was for Italian POWs. A vote to allow the sale of alcohol passed by a mere 477 votes in 1969, thus ending temperance in the city.

The Greeley Philharmonic Orchestra was started in 1911. In 1958, Greeley became the first city to have a Department of Culture.

Geography

Greeley is bordered on the south by the towns of Evans and Garden City. The Greeley/Evans area is bounded on the south by the South Platte River, and the Cache la Poudre River flows through north Greeley. The city is served by US Route 85 and US Route 34.

At the 2020 United States Census, the city had a total area of  including  of water.

The nearest city with a population of over 100,000 is Fort Collins, in neighboring Larimer County.

Climate

Greeley experiences a semi-arid climate (Köppen BSk). High temperatures are generally around 90–95 °F (32 °C) in the summer and 40-45 °F (4 °C) in the winter, although significant variation occurs. The hottest days generally occur around the third week of July and the coldest in January. Nighttime lows are near 60 °F (16 °C) in the summer and around 15–20 °F (−9 °C) in the winter. Record high temperatures of 112 °F (44.4 °C) have been recorded, as have record low temperatures of –25 °F (–32 °C). The first freeze typically occurs around October 4 and the last around May 4. Extratropical cyclones which disrupt the weather for the eastern two-thirds of the US often originate in or near Colorado, which means Greeley does not experience many fully developed storm systems. Warm fronts, sleet, and freezing rain are practically nonexistent here. In addition, the city's proximity to the Rocky Mountains and lower elevation, compared to the mountains west of the city, result in less precipitation and fewer thunderstorms. This is paradoxical, because adjacent areas (mostly farmland) experience between 7 and 9 hail days per year.

The climate in Greeley, as well as all of Colorado, is extremely dry. The Chinook winds coming off the mountains often raise temperatures to near 70 °F (21 °C) in January and February, and sometimes to near 90 °F (32 °C) in April. Greeley's elevation and low year-round humidity means that nighttime low temperatures are practically never above 68 °F (20 °C), even in the hottest part of the summer. The diurnal temperature range is usually rather wide, with a 50-degree (Fahrenheit) difference between daytime highs and nighttime lows not uncommon, especially in the spring and fall. Rapid day-to-day and diurnal fluctuation in temperature is also common.

Demographics 

As of the 2010 census, there were 92,889 people, 33,427 households, and 21,250 families residing in the city. The age distribution shows 68,936 residents are age 18 and older and 23,953 residents are under 18 years of age. The age distribution of the population showed 31.3% from 0 to 19, 11.4% from 20 to 24, 25.4% from 25 to 44, 21.1% from 45 to 64, and 10.7% ages 65+. The median age was 30.5 years old. The gender distribution was 49.1% male and 50.9% female. For every 100 females, there were 96.6 males. For every 100 females age 18 and over, there were 93.9 males.

The racial makeup of the city was 79.1% White, 1.7% African American, 1.2% Native American, 1.3% Asian, 0.1% Pacific Islander, 13.2% from other races, and 3.4% from two or more races. Hispanic or Latino of any race were 36.0% of the population.

Out of 33,427 total households, 21,250 (63.3%) were family households where at least one member of the household was related to the householder by birth, marriage, or adoption. 12,177 (36.4%) households were non-family households consisting of people living alone and households which did not have any members related to the householder. Of the 21,250 family households, 11,495 (54.1%) had children under the age of 18 living with them.

The median income for a household in the city was $44,226, and the median income for a family was $55,277. Males had a median, full-time income of $40,122 versus $35,294 for females. The per capita income for the city was $21,372.

15.7% of families and 23.5% of the population had income below the poverty line during the 12 months prior to being surveyed. People with incomes below the poverty line include 32.1% of those under age 18 and 8.9% of those age 65 or over.

The crime rate (per 100,000 people) is below the national average, according to city-data.com. The website gave the city an aggregate crime rating of 289.6 in 2012, against a national average score of 301.1.

Economy
Among the companies based in Greeley are the meatpacker JBS USA, the outsourcing company StarTek, and the contractor Hensel Phelps Construction. The Colorado/Kansas operations of natural gas utility Atmos Energy are based in Greeley.

Largest employers by numbers of employees
According to the city's 2020 Comprehensive Annual Financial Report, the following are the Greeley area's largest employers:

Military
The 233rd Space Group (233rd SG) is a unit of the Colorado Air National Guard located at Greeley Air National Guard Station, Greeley, Colorado. The Greeley A.N.G. Station is adjacent to the Greeley–Weld County Airport and makes use of its runways.

Arts and culture
In 2014 the Greeley Creative District was certified as an official Creative District by the Colorado Office of Economic Development and International Trade.

Union Colony Civic Center
Greeley is home to the Union Colony Civic Center, one of the largest performing arts venues in Colorado. The 1686 seat Monfort Concert Hall hosts touring Broadway musicals, concerts, comedians, along with regional and local performing arts groups. The 214 seat Hensel Phelps Theatre hosts The Stampede Troupe in addition to lectures, meetings, and smaller performances. In addition, the Tointon Gallery presents a dozen exhibits annually by local, regional, and national artists, and is free to the public.

Owned and operated by the City of Greeley, the Union Colony Civic Center sponsors many events held by the University of Northern Colorado, Greeley Philharmonic Orchestra, the Greeley Chorale and the Stampede Troupe theater company.

Education

Of Greeley residents ages 18 and over, 82.2% are high school graduates and 25.9% have a bachelor's degree or higher.

Primary and secondary schools

In 2020, there were approximately 24,200 children ages 5–18 living in Greeley, about 18% of the population. Most areas in Greeley and the neighboring Evans lie in Greeley-Evans School District 6. This public school district operates two preschool programs, 11 elementary schools, six K–8 schools, four middle schools (grades 6–8), one junior high school (grades 7–9), three traditional and three non-traditional high schools, and one K–12 online school. The school district also operates the Poudre Learning Center, a community resource focused on providing educational programming about the Cache la Poudre river. Many public schools offer one or more magnet programs, which enable students from around the district to attend public schools other than their assigned neighborhood school to participate in a unique educational program. Examples include Greeley West High School's International Baccalaureate and agriculture programs, Greeley Central High School's arts magnet program, and Northridge High School's science, technology, engineering and math (STEM) and horticulture programs.

In addition to the school district's own schools, it also charters and oversees six charter schools: University Schools (K–12), Frontier Academy (K–12), West Ridge Academy (K–8), Salida del Sol (K–8, bilingual school), Union Colony Elementary School (K–5), Union Colony Preparatory School (6–12). The district also partially is affiliated with four "community partner" preschools, which are private preschools all or partially funded and overseen by the school district. Many of the district's charter high schools and non-traditional public high schools maintain a relationship with Aims Community College and/or the University of Northern Colorado to provide supplemental courses for high school students.

There are at least five wholly private primary or secondary schools inside the Greeley city limits: St. Mary's Catholic School (P–7), Dayspring Christian School (P–12), Trinity Lutheran School (P–6), Adventure Child Care Center (P–6), and the Colorado Heritage Educational School System (K–12). Additionally, there are at least three private preschools: #1 Child Enrichment-Superior Childcare, Shepherd of the Hills Lutheran School, and ABC Central. In Colorado, private schools are considered businesses and are not regulated by the Colorado Department of Education or local school boards. In 2021, the Greeley-Evans school district reported 229 students who are home-schooled full-time; some number of these students may be affiliated with a private school for record-keeping purposes and some may attend public or charter schools for a few courses, making the exact number of home-schooled students in Greeley difficult to specify.

Colleges and universities
Greeley is also home to University of Northern Colorado, Aims Community College, Academy of Natural Therapy, and Institute of Business & Medical Careers.

Sister cities
Greeley is a sister city to Moriya, a city located in Japan's Ibaraki Prefecture. The cities host a collaborative student exchange program—on odd-numbered years the City of Greeley sponsors ten high-school students to visit Moriya for a week, and on even-numbered years Greeley hosts students from the city. From 2020 until at least 2022, the student exchange aspect of the program was temporarily suspended due to the COVID-19 pandemic.

Infrastructure

Health care

North Colorado Medical Center is the primary medical facility for Weld County. The hospital opened in 1904 as the Greeley Hospital. The name of the facility evolved over the years to Weld County General Hospital and that became North Colorado Medical Center. The center is operated by Banner Health-based out of Phoenix, Arizona.
The hospital recently expanded its facilities and added a new addition which expanded its emergency room and increased the amount of rooms available for patients in other departments.

On June 23, 2011, Poudre Valley Health Systems and the University of Colorado Medical School announced a pending joint operations agreement. If approved, it would overtake NCMC as the largest regional hospital in Northern Colorado. In 2010, Greeley Medical Clinic, the largest and oldest medical group in Greeley announced it was affiliating with PVHS.

Poudre Valley Health Systems merged with University of Colorado Health in 2011 resulting in new and improved healthcare facilities all around Colorado. A brand-new 153,300 foot hospital in West Greeley is set to open in Spring of 2019. The UCH facility will provide Greeley residents with an additional option for inpatient healthcare services rather than only NCMC and is conveniently located off of Highway 34.

Government

Greeley operates under a council-manager system of government, where the city council, composed of 7 members, adopts laws and policies for the city, in addition to establishing priorities. This council includes elected members from each of the four wards, two at-large members, and the mayor.

Since 2006, the Greeley Police Department has received more than $2.3 million of tactical military equipment from the United States Department of Defense (DoD) including a "mine resistant vehicle", 72 5.56 mm rifles, 22 suppressors, and 15 sniperscopes. Prior to 2014, when the information was made public by the DoD in response to public scrutiny over widespread police militarization in the United States, the program details had been closely guarded and little information had been released during the previous 20 years.

Media

Transportation 
Public transportation in Greeley is provided by Greeley-Evans Transit (GET), which operates seven local bus routes across Greeley. Since January 2, 2020, GET operates a regional bus service called the Poudre Express which connects Greeley to Fort Collins and Windsor. Express Arrow also operates buses to Denver and Buffalo stopping at multiple other cities along the way.

In popular culture
First known as the Greeley Spud Rodeo in 1922, the summer celebration was renamed the Greeley Independence Stampede by 1972. This locally famous event typically lasts nearly two weeks leading up to Independence Day. Including events like a demolition derby, rodeos, carnival rides and games, food vendors, live musical performances, and even a  parade; this yearly tradition has grown to draw-in visitors from neighboring cities and states. The average yearly attendance to the event is nearly 250,000.

On December 12, 2006, the Immigration and Customs Enforcement (I.C.E) staged a coordinated predawn raid at the Swift & Co. meat packing plant in Greeley and at five other Swift plants in western states, interviewing undocumented workers and transporting hundreds off in buses.

In August 2010, Leprino Foods announced plans for a new $270 million factory in Greeley. Construction began in July 2010, and consisted of three phases. The final phase was finished in 2017, and 500 people are currently employed at the facility.

A fictionalized Greeley was featured heavily in the season 15 finale episode of the popular animated television show South Park, titled "The Poor Kid". The episode sees main characters Kenny McCormick and Eric Cartman move to the town, after being put into foster care.

In June 2012 Greeley became the first city in the state of Colorado to implement SB11-273 known as the Law of Common Consumption allowing for patrons of the Downtown Greeley Entertainment District to buy drinks in "Go-Cups," from participating downtown establishments.

On May 12, 2014, Greeley was ranked number #5 of 10 "Top Small Cities for Jobs" in a Forbes article. On July 23, 2014 Forbes ranked Greeley as #4 of 10 "List of Best Cities for Job Growth".

Local writers
James A. Michener attended Colorado State College of Education, now the University of Northern Colorado, in 1936–37. He was a social science educator at the training school and at the college from 1936 to 1941. He conceived the idea for his acclaimed 1974 novel Centennial during his stay in Greeley, basing it on the real history of the town and the Colorado region.

Notable people

See also

Colorado
Bibliography of Colorado
Index of Colorado-related articles
Outline of Colorado
List of counties in Colorado
List of municipalities in Colorado
List of places in Colorado
List of statistical areas in Colorado
Front Range Urban Corridor
North Central Colorado Urban Area
Denver-Aurora, CO Combined Statistical Area
Greeley, CO Metropolitan Statistical Area
Impact of the 2019–20 coronavirus pandemic on the meat industry in the United States

References

The National Center for Atmospheric Research & the UCAR Office of Programs. Website. Retrieved January 24, 2007

External links

City of Greeley website

 
Cities in Colorado
Cities in Weld County, Colorado
County seats in Colorado
Horace Greeley
Populated places established in 1869
1869 establishments in Colorado Territory